Calcareous grassland (or alkaline grassland) is an ecosystem associated with thin basic soil, such as that on chalk and limestone downland.  Plants on calcareous grassland are typically short and hardy, and include grasses and herbs such as clover.  Calcareous grassland is an important habitat for insects, particularly butterflies and ants, and is kept at a plagioclimax by grazing animals, usually sheep and sometimes cattle. Rabbits used to play a part but due to the onset of myxomatosis their numbers decreased so dramatically that they no longer have much of a grazing effect.

There are large areas of calcareous grassland in northwestern Europe, particularly areas of southern England, such as Salisbury Plain and the North and South Downs.

The machair forms a different kind of calcareous grassland, where fertile low-lying plains are formed on ground that is calcium-rich due to shell sand (pulverised sea shells).

See also
 Alvar
 Chalk heath
 Edaphic
 Gypcrust
 Gypsum flora of Nova Scotia
 Rendzina

Notes

References
 Gibson, C.W.D. (1995). Chalk grasslands on former arable land: a review. Bioscan (UK) Ltd, Oxford.
 Gibson, C.W.D. & Brown, V.K. (1991). The nature and rate of development of calcareous grassland in southern Britain. Biological Conservation, 58, 297-316.
 Hillier, S.H., Walton, D.W.H. & Wells, D.A. (Eds.) (1990). Calcareous grasslands - ecology and management. Bluntisham, Huntingdon.
Mugnai M, Frasconi Wendt C, Balzani P, Ferretti G, Dal Cin M, Masoni A, Frizzi F, Santini G, Viciani D, Foggi B, Lazzaro L. (2021). Small-scale drivers on plant and ant diversity in a grassland habitat through a multifaceted approach. PeerJ 9:e12517 https://doi.org/10.7717/peerj.12517

 Smith, C.J. (1980). The Ecology of the English Chalk. Academic Press, London.

Grasslands
Soil
Habitats